Plunder of Peach and Plum is an early Chinese sound film from 1934. Produced by the left-leaning Shanghai-based Diantong Film Company, Plunder was directed by Ying Yunwei and starred popular actor Yuan Muzhi (who also co-wrote the screenplay). It is alternatively known as The Fate of Graduates.

The film was featured in the 62nd Venice International Film Festival as part of their retrospective, The Secret History of Asian Cinema.

The theme song for the film is called "" (毕业歌).

Plot 
The film tells the tragic story of two recent college graduates, Tao Jianping ("Tao" is a homophone for peach), and Li Lilian ("Li" is a homophone for plum). Married, the two hope to change society for the better, but are continuously challenged by the corruption and injustice of Chinese society.

Cast 
 Yuan Muzhi as Tao
 Chen Bo'er as Li

References

External links 
 
 
 
 Plunder of Peach and Plum at the Chinese Movie Database
 Plunder of Peach and Plum from the UCSD Chinese cinema learning center

Chinese black-and-white films
1930s Mandarin-language films
1934 films
1934 romantic drama films
Films about labor relations
Chinese romantic drama films
Films directed by Ying Yunwei